GPB may refer to:

 Gazprombank, a Russian bank
 Georgia Public Broadcasting, the public broadcast network in the American state of Georgia
 Georgian Public Broadcaster, the national public broadcaster of the nation of Georgia
 Global power barometer
 Glossopharyngeal breathing
 Google Protocol Buffers, a method of serializing structured data
 GrandPooBear, a video game streamer
 Granny Peace Brigade, an American peace organizations
 Gravity Probe B, a satellite-based test of general relativity
 Guarapuava Airport, in Brazil
 Gist Productie Bedrijf, in Delft, the Netherlands